"What I Like About You" is a song by American rock band the Romantics. Written by band members Wally Palmar, Mike Skill and Jimmy Marinos in 1979, the song is included on the band's self-titled debut album (1980), and was also released as a single in late 1979. Marinos, the band's drummer, is the lead vocalist on the song. The band filmed a music video for the song that appeared frequently on MTV during the early 1980s.

Michael Morales took the song even higher in 1989, Lillix also sang this song in 2003 and 5 Seconds of Summer covered the song in their 2014 self-titled debut album.

Writing and original version
"What I Like About You" was written by Palmar, Marinos and Skill around a guitar part by Skill. The song's "Hey, uh-huh-huh" refrain was influenced by the Yardbirds' "Over Under Sideways Down" and Chuck Berry's "Back in the U.S.A." The song's riff is slightly similar to Neil Diamond's "Cherry, Cherry", the Standells' 1966 hit "Sometimes Good Guys Don't Wear White", and Joe Jackson's 1979 single "I'm the Man." The Romantics recorded the song and the accompanying album at Coconuts Recording Studio in Miami Beach, Florida.

When first released, "What I Like About You" was already a popular song on the Romantics' concert playlist. In terms of record sales and radio airplay, however, the song was only a moderate success at the time of its release, reaching number 49 on the Billboard Hot 100. The song was most successful in Australia, where it reached number two on the Australian Singles Chart (Kent Music Report) for two weeks and became the 13th most successful single for 1980. It was only towards the end of the 1980s, after the song had been licensed for use in television commercials for Budweiser beer, that "What I Like About You" grew to become one of the most popular rock anthems of all time.
The video that was played on MTV was shot at the University of Michigan Dearborn's recreational center.

Guitar Hero legal case
In November 2007, the Romantics filed a federal lawsuit against Activision, the publisher of Guitar Hero Encore: Rocks the 80s, claiming that the video game manufacturer had infringed on the band's rights by featuring a soundalike recording of "What I Like About You" in the game. The Romantics lost their case in December 2007, with the judge stating that Activision had taken all the necessary steps in developing its product.

Charts

Weekly charts

Year-end charts

Certifications and sales

Michael Morales version

Michael Morales released a version of "What I Like About You" in 1989, as the follow-up to his hit "Who Do You Give Your Love To". His version reached number 28 on the Billboard Hot 100, eclipsing the position of the original version.

5 Seconds of Summer version

The song was covered by Australian pop rock band 5 Seconds of Summer for their 2014 She Looks So Perfect EP, reaching number 137 on the UK Singles Chart. The studio mix of the song is included on the group's 2014 live album, LiveSOS, and was serviced to American mainstream radio on December 2, 2014, as its lead single. It received strong airplay for the week ending December 28, 2014 and debuted on the Billboard Pop Songs chart, where it has since peaked at number 30.

The band performed the song live at the 2014 American Music Awards on November 23, 2014, ahead of its release. They also performed the song live on Good Morning America on August 21, 2015, in promotion of their new single She's Kinda Hot.

Music video
A lyric video for the live version was uploaded to 5 Seconds of Summer's Vevo account November 23, 2014, the same day as their AMA performance. The official music video was directed by Tom van Schelven and premiered on December 5, 2014. It uses the live audio rather than the studio mix and features concert footage from the group's performance at The Forum near Los Angeles, as well behind-the-scenes clips and shots of the audience.

Charts

Poison version
"What I Like About You" was covered by American rock band Poison as the lead single from their cover album Poison'd! (2007). The band released a music video for the single.

References

External links
Song review, includes an introduction on the Romantics
Documentary on the Guitar Hero legal dispute

1979 songs
1979 singles
2007 singles
The Romantics songs
Lillix songs
Poison (American band) songs
Epic Records singles
Capitol Records singles
Song recordings produced by John Feldmann